Mehdi Izadi is an Iranian football forward who currently plays for Naft Masjed Soleyman in the Persian Gulf Pro League.

References

Living people
1998 births
Association football forwards
Iranian footballers
Naft Masjed Soleyman F.C. players